This article summarizes the events related to the world of poker in 1981.

Major Tournaments

1981 World Series of Poker 

Stu Ungar wins the main tournament.

1981 Super Bowl of Poker 

Junior whited wins the main tournament.

Poker Hall of Fame 

Bill Boyd is inducted

See also 

 Chronology of poker

References 

1981 in poker